Dongru Siongju is an Indian politician who is serving as Member of 10th Arunachal Pradesh Assembly from Bomdila Assembly constituency. In December 2020, he switched to Bharatiya Janata Party.

References 

Bharatiya Janata Party politicians from Arunachal Pradesh
Arunachal Pradesh MLAs 2019–2024
Living people
Year of birth missing (living people)